Varnia is a small genus of moth lacewings, in the family Ithonidae. The genus is restricted to Australia, with only two species.

References

Ithonidae
Insects of Australia
Neuroptera genera